Neny Glacier is a glacier on the southwest side of Hemimont Plateau flowing northwest into the north part of Neny Fjord on the west side of Antarctic Peninsula. This feature together with Gibbs Glacier, which flows southeast, occupy a transverse depression between Neny Fjord and Mercator Ice Piedmont on the east side of Antarctic Peninsula. The name Neny Glacier, derived from association with Neny Fjord, was first used by the U.S. Antarctic Service, 1939–41, whose members used the glacier as a sledging route.

Further reading 
 William James Mills, Exploring Polar Frontiers: A Historical Encyclopedia, P 122

External links 

 Neny Glacier on USGS website
 Neny Glacier on SCAR website

References 

Glaciers of Fallières Coast